George Stephen Morrison (January 7, 1919 – November 17, 2008) was a United States Navy rear admiral (upper half) and naval aviator. Morrison was commander of United States naval forces during the Gulf of Tonkin Incident of August 1964, which sparked an escalation of American involvement in the Vietnam War. He was the father of Jim Morrison, the lead singer of the rock band The Doors, who died on July 3, 1971.

Early life and education
Born January 7, 1919, in Rome, Georgia, Morrison was the son of Caroline (née Hoover; 1891–1984) and Paul Raymund Morrison (1886–1971), and raised in Leesburg, Florida. The Morrison family was descended from Scottish settlers who emigrated to America in the late 18th century. He entered the U.S. Naval Academy in 1938, graduated in 1941, and was commissioned an ensign. Sent to Hawaii, he joined the crew of the destroyer . On December 7, 1941, Morrison witnessed the Japanese attack on Pearl Harbor.

Career

Morrison began flight training in 1943 at Naval Air Station Pensacola, Florida, and graduated in spring 1944, and went on to fly combat missions in the Grumman F6F Hellcat. He flew missions in the Pacific Theater for the duration of World War II. He served as an instructor on nuclear weapons programs following the end of the war, while during the Korean War, he served at the joint operations center in Seoul. This resulted in the award of the Bronze Star Medal with "V" for Valor device.

He was in command of the Carrier Division during the controversial Gulf of Tonkin Incident in August 1964, which resulted effectively in the true beginning of the Vietnam War by President Lyndon Johnson.

In 1967, Morrison was promoted to rear admiral. In WestPac in 1968, he commanded a Task Group that was part of Task Force 77 commanded by Vice Admiral Ralph Cousins; the  served as his flagship. Besides operations against communist forces in North Vietnam, the task force was diverted to Korea in December 1968 to support South Korean forces battling North Korean infiltrators during the Korean DMZ Conflict. He successfully led the Task Force in the interdiction of communist North Korean forces in spite of attempts by Soviet Navy destroyers to prevent flight operations by attempting to cross the path of the Hancock. In 1972, he was appointed Commander Naval Forces Marianas. As such, he was in charge of relief efforts for Vietnamese refugees sent to Guam after the fall of Saigon in the spring of 1975.

Morrison was the keynote speaker at the decommissioning ceremony for the carrier Bon Homme Richard, his first ship as an admiral, on July 2, 1971, in Washington D.C. His estranged son, rock musician Jim Morrison, died in Paris at age 27 the following day.

Morrison retired from the Navy in August 1975 as a rear admiral (upper half).

Personal life and retirement
Morrison met and married Clara Virginia Clarke (1919–2005) in Hawaii in 1942. Their son Jim Morrison (later, lead singer of rock band The Doors) was born in 1943 in Melbourne, Florida, where they lived at the time while stationed at Naval Air Station Melbourne. A daughter, Anne Robin Morrison, was born in 1945 in Albuquerque, New Mexico, and became a school teacher in Thousand Oaks, California, and a son, Andrew Lee Morrison, was born in 1948 in Los Altos, California, and lives in Ashburn, VA.

In retirement, the Morrisons lived in Coronado and Chula Vista, California. Clara Clarke Morrison died after a long illness in Coronado on December 29, 2005. Rear Admiral Morrison died in Coronado on November 17, 2008 at the age of 89. His private memorial service was held on November 24 at Fort Rosecrans National Cemetery in San Diego. His ashes were scattered at sea near the same spot off Point Loma where his wife's ashes had been scattered nearly three years earlier.

Awards and decorations
Morrison was a recipient of the following military decorations and service medals:

References

External links

Coronado Clarion – Remembering: Admiral George Stephen Morrison 
Together We Served – MORRISON, George Stephen, RADM 

1919 births
2008 deaths
United States Navy personnel of World War II
People from Chula Vista, California
People from Leesburg, Florida
People from Rome, Georgia
Recipients of the Navy Distinguished Service Medal
Recipients of the Legion of Merit
Jim Morrison
Attack on Pearl Harbor
United States Naval Academy alumni
United States Navy rear admirals (upper half)
Burials at sea
Recipients of the Air Medal
United States Navy personnel of the Korean War